Erika Duron Miranda, (born August 20, 1974) is a Mexican sprint canoer who competed in the mid-1990s. She participated in the 1995 Pan American Games and earned a silver medal for her country in the Women's K1 500m canoe sprint event. Duron subsequently competed at the 1996 Summer Olympics in Atlanta, but was eliminated in the repechages of the K-1 500 m event and the semifinals of the K-4 500 m event.

References

External links
Sports-Reference.com profile

1974 births
Canoeists at the 1996 Summer Olympics
Mexican female canoeists
Living people
Olympic canoeists of Mexico
Pan American Games silver medalists for Mexico
Pan American Games medalists in canoeing
Canoeists at the 1995 Pan American Games
Medalists at the 1995 Pan American Games
20th-century Mexican women
21st-century Mexican women